Dion Gosling (born 2 June 1971 in Howick, New Zealand) is a field hockey player from New Zealand. He won a silver medal at the 2002 Commonwealth Games in the men's team competition. He earned a total number of 169 caps during his career.

References
NZ caps

External links
 

New Zealand male field hockey players
1971 births
Living people
Commonwealth Games silver medallists for New Zealand
Field hockey players at the 1998 Commonwealth Games
1998 Men's Hockey World Cup players
Field hockey players at the 2002 Commonwealth Games
2002 Men's Hockey World Cup players
Field hockey players at the 2004 Summer Olympics
Olympic field hockey players of New Zealand
Commonwealth Games medallists in field hockey
Medallists at the 2002 Commonwealth Games